Aegypius jinniushanensis is an extinct Old World vulture which existed in what is now China during the Middle Pleistocene period. It was described by Zihui Zhang, Yunping Huang, Helen F. James and Lianhai Hou in 2012.

References

External links

Aegypius
Pleistocene birds
Old World vultures
Fossil taxa described in 2012
Birds described in 2012
Prehistoric birds of Asia
Taxa named by Helen F. James